Queen Mother Tshering Pem Wangchuck (born 22 December 1957) is one of the four wives and queens of Bhutanese king Jigme Singye Wangchuck, who ruled until his abdication in 2006. She is the Queen Mother (Gyalyum Kude, literally meaning "Queen Mother") of Bhutan.

Biography
Her father, Yab Dasho Ugyen Dorji (1925–2019), was the Founder and Proprietor of Ugyen Academy (03/04/2002). Her mother is Yum Thuiji Zam (b. 1932).

She was educated at St. Joseph's Convent, Kalimpong, and St. Helen's School, Kurseong, India.

Children
She had, with the former king, the following children:

Patronages  
 Co-Chairman of the Bhutan Foundation.
 President of the Bhutan Youth Development Foundation (YDF).

See also
 House of Wangchuck
 Line of succession to the Bhutanese throne

References

Notes

External links
 Bhutan News Online
 World Who's Who

Living people
Bhutanese monarchy
1957 births
Queen mothers
Wangchuck dynasty